La Teja is a barrio (neighbourhood or district) of Montevideo, Uruguay. The neighborhood has a mix of residential and industrial properties, mostly occupied by working class communities, including with a number of informal settlements built on former industrial sites. 

The barrio is notable for its high concentration of industrial sites, including the La Teja Refinery, that have spawned a local environmental justice activism community. In particular, high concentrations of lead contamination lead to national policy and attention.

Name 
The neighborhood was established in 12 of September 1842 as Puebla Victoria, naming it after the then Queen of England Queen Victoria. However, the community eventually became known as la teja. Two competing theories are available for the change in name: it either refers to the distinctive clay tiles (tejas) used in the early architecture of the neighborhood or in reference to the slave quarters in the area that either had the tiles, or in slang for the enslaved men referred to by the tiles they made.

Location
It shares borders with Tres Ombúes to the north west, Belvedere to the north, El Prado / Nueva Savona barrio to the north east, Capurro to the south east and borders the Bay of Montevideo to the south. To the west of its southern part it borders the Pantanoso Creek, across which starts the Villa del Cerro.

In La Teja is located the Cementerio de La Teja, Montevideo.

History 
Before being recognized as a town, Jesuits and Spanish, Italian and Basque immigrants had created communities in the area that would become La Teja. Buying Jesuit land, the British entrepreneur Samuel Fisher Lafone created a meat curing plant in the area, and with the help of the city planned 122 city blocks in the area. The neighborhood was established in 12 of September 1842 as Puebla Victoria, naming it after the then Queen of England Queen Victoria.

The neighborhood later grew during the early 21st century waves of European immigrants to Uruguay. These communities created an industrial working class neighborhood strongly identified with militancy and solidarity found in urban politics in the region. The Civic-military dictatorship of Uruguay targeted local leaders in the neighborhood during its repression of dissent. 

During the industrial period lead by Import substitution industrialization policies, the neighborhood grew during the 1970s and 80s as workers moved into the neighborhood to be near factories. As workers built up housing in the area, the native marsh was frequently backfilled with industrial and construction waste that was easily available. Both formal and informal settlements in the neighborhood were built on reclaimed, and sometimes contaminated, industrial sites.

In the early 2000s, several local children were identified to have high lead exposure. After investigation, doctors and public health officials discovered broad contamination of the community. In response, the community formed what anthropologist Daniel Renfrew called "the first environmental justice movement in Uruguay", embodied in the organization Comisión Vivir sin Plomo (Commission for a Life Without Lead). The group was led by Carlos Pilo, a local militant community organizer. The campaign led by the community resulted in a widespread public health awareness of lead contamination and eventual regulation in the country.

Economy

Refinery

Institutions

Places of worship 
 Parish Church of the Holy Family, Av. Carlos María Ramirez 677 (Roman Catholic)

Radio stations 

 El Puente FM

See also 
Barrios of Montevideo
 Samuel Fisher Lafone

References

External links 
 Revista Raíces/ Historia del barrio La Teja
 

Barrios of Montevideo